Samuel Barkas (29 December 1909 – 10 December 1989) was an English football player and manager who played at left back for Bradford City and Manchester City.

Career
Born in Wardley Colliery, England, Barkas had worked in the pits and farm before leaving his junior club Middle Dock to join Bradford City in 1928. He played four games in his first season, before in his first full season in 1928–29 he helped City to the Division Three (North) title. He played a total of 202 games for City before he was sold to Manchester City for £5,000 in 1933.

At Manchester City he picked up a Championship medal and a Division Two title. He played until 1946 appearing 176 times and scoring one goal.

He also won five caps for England and captained his country three times.

He later managed Workington and Wigan and was a scout for Manchester City and Leeds United.

Family
Barkas was one of five brothers who all had professional careers; the others were Ned, Harry, Jimmy and Tommy. His cousin Billy Felton played for Sheffield Wednesday, Manchester City and Tottenham Hotspur and made one appearance for England.

Honours

Player
Bradford City
 Football League Third Division North: 1928–29

Manchester City
 Football League Championship: 1936–37
 Football League Second Division: 1946–47

References

External links
England career profile

1909 births
1989 deaths
English footballers
England international footballers
English football managers
Bradford City A.F.C. players
Manchester City F.C. players
Manchester City F.C. non-playing staff
Wigan Athletic F.C. managers
English Football League players
Association football fullbacks
English Football League representative players
Workington A.F.C. managers
Leeds United F.C. non-playing staff
Barkas family